Maciej Muzaj (born 21 May 1994) is a Polish professional volleyball player. He is a member of the Poland national team. At the professional club level, he plays for Asseco Resovia.

Career

Clubs
He won a title of the 2014 Polish Champion with PGE Skra Bełchatów. On 19 June 2015, he signed a contract with Jastrzębski Węgiel. He replaced Michał Łasko, whose departure Jastrzębski Węgiel announced on the same day.

Honours

Clubs
 National championships
 2013/2014  Polish Championship, with PGE Skra Bełchatów
 2014/2015  Polish SuperCup, with PGE Skra Bełchatów

Individual awards
 2019: Polish Championship – Best Scorer (611)
 2019: Polish Championship – Best Spiker 
 2020: Russian Championship – Best Scorer

References

External links

 
 Player profile at LegaVolley.it  
 Player profile at PlusLiga.pl  
 Player profile at Volleybox.net

Living people
1994 births
Sportspeople from Wrocław
Polish men's volleyball players
Polish Champions of men's volleyball
Polish expatriate sportspeople in Russia
Expatriate volleyball players in Russia
Polish expatriate sportspeople in Italy
Expatriate volleyball players in Italy
Skra Bełchatów players
Jastrzębski Węgiel players
Trefl Gdańsk players
Projekt Warsaw players
Ural Ufa volleyball players
Resovia (volleyball) players
Opposite hitters